Mannargudi Easwaran (born  April 1, 1947) is a leading contemporary mridangam player and Carnatic musician. He was a staff artiste of All India Radio and has received several awards, such as the Sangeet Natak Akademi Award (2008) and Kartik Fine Arts’ Lifetime Achievement Award.

In the 2018 music season, Madras Music Academy dropped Easwaran from its programming due to allegations of sexual harassment against him.

References

External links
 Mannargudi A Easwaran website

1947 births
Living people
Mridangam players
Recipients of the Sangeet Natak Akademi Award